Charles Joseph Marty-Laveaux (13 April 1823, Paris – 11 July 1899, Vitry-sur-Seine) was a French literary scholar. He is best known for his La Pléiade Française, a long series of editions of the poets of La Pléiade. He also edited Corneille's works (1862–68).

External links
 
 

1823 births
1899 deaths
French scholars
French male writers